Oscar Zamora may refer to:
Óscar Zamora Medinaceli (1934–2017), Bolivian politician
Oscar Zamora (baseball) (born 1944), Cuban baseball player